The 2021–22 Southern Football League season was the 119th in the history of the Southern League since its establishment in 1894. The league had two Premier divisions (Central and South) at Step 3 of the National League System (NLS) and two Division One divisions (Central and South) at Step 4. These correspond to levels 7 and 8 of the English football league system.

The allocations for Step 4 this season were announced by The Football Association (FA) on 17 May 2021.
 
The scheduled restructuring of the non-League system took place at the end of the 2020–21 season and a new division was added to the Northern Premier League at Step 4 for 2021–22, which resulted in some reallocations into or out of, and promotions to, the Southern League's Step 4 divisions.

Premier Division Central

After Kings Langley were transferred to the Premier Division South, The Premier Division Central consisted of 21 clubs, all from the previous aborted season.

League table

Play-offs

Semi-finals

Final

Results

Stadia and locations

Premier Division South

The Premier Division consisted of 22 clubs: 20 clubs from the previous season, and two new clubs:
Kings Langley, transferred from the Premier Division Central
Merthyr Town, returned after one-season absence

League table

Play-offs

Semi-finals

Final

Results

Stadia and locations

Division One Central

Division One Central consisted of 20 clubs: 14 clubs from the previous season, and six new clubs.
Clubs, transferred from Isthmian League South Central Division:
FC Romania
Harlow Town
Hertford Town
Waltham Abbey
Ware

Plus:
Colney Heath, promoted from the Spartan South Midlands League

League table

Play-offs

Semi-finals

Final

Inter-step play-offs

Results

Stadia and locations

Division One South

After Moneyfields voluntary relegated from the league, Division One South consisted of 19 clubs: 17 clubs from the previous season, and two new clubs:
Lymington Town, promoted from the Wessex League
Plymouth Parkway, promoted from the Western League

League table

Play-offs
{{4TeamBracket
| RD1=Semi-finals
| RD2=Final
| group1=
| group2=
| RD1-seed1= 2
| RD1-team1= Frome Town| RD1-score1= 1
| RD1-seed2= 5
| RD1-team2= Bristol Manor Farm| RD1-score2= 3| RD1-seed3= 3
| RD1-team3= Cirencester Town
| RD1-score3= 1
| RD1-seed4= 4
| RD1-team4= Winchester City| RD1-score4= 4| RD2-seed1= 4
| RD2-team1= Winchester City| RD2-score1= 4| RD2-seed2= 5
| RD2-team2= Bristol Manor Farm
| RD2-score2= 1
}}Semi-finalsFinal'''

Inter-step play-offs

Results

Stadia and locations

Relegation reprieves

Step 3
Seven clubs at Step 3, all four fourth-from-bottom teams and those placed third-from-bottom that are the top three on a points per game (PPG) basis, were reprieved from relegation. The remaining team was relegated to Step 4.

The final points-per-game ranking of the third-from-bottom placed teams in Step 3 divisions was as follows:

Source:

Step 4
Ten of the 16 clubs at Step 4, all eight fourth-from-bottom teams and two clubs placed third-from-bottom, one at the top and the other in third place on a points per game (PPG) basis, were reprieved from contesting relegation play-offs. The FA granted third-placed Sheffield a reprieve after demoting Yorkshire Amateur from the Northern Premier League for non-compliance with Step 4 ground grading requirements. The remaining six teams contested one-off matches with six runners-up from Step 5 that had the fewest PPG at the end of the 2021–22 season. Three winners of their matches stayed at Step 4 for the 2022–23 season, while three others lost theirs and were relegated to Step 5.

The final points-per-game ranking of the 3rd-from-bottom-placed teams in Step 4 divisions was also as follows:

Source:

See also
 Southern Football League
 2021–22 Isthmian League
 2021–22 Northern Premier League

References

External links
Official website

Southern Football League seasons
7
Eng